Urali may refer to:
 Urali language, a language of Kerala, India
 Urali Gounder, an ethnic group of India
 Urali Kanchan, or Urali, a village in Maharashtra, India
 Urali railway station, in Maharashtra, India

See also 
 Uralic languages, a primary language family
 Uruli, a type of cookware